The spiny whorltail iguana (Stenocercus crassicaudatus) is a species of lizard of the Tropiduridae family, found in the state of Cusco, southeast Peru. It was first described by Johann Jakob von Tschudi in 1845.

References

Stenocercus
Reptiles described in 1845
Taxa named by Johann Jakob von Tschudi
Endemic fauna of Peru
Reptiles of Peru